Carrollton is an unincorporated community in Burlington Township, Carroll County, Indiana.

History
A post office was established in Carrollton in 1838, but it closed one year later, in 1839.

Geography

Education
Carrollton residents may obtain a library card at the Burlington Community Library in Burlington.

References

Unincorporated communities in Carroll County, Indiana
Unincorporated communities in Indiana